Salten Police District is one of 27 police districts in Norway, covering the Salten district of Nordland. The district is headquartered in Bodø and consists of one police station and nine sheriff's offices. The district is led by Chief of Police Geir Ove Heir. Specifically the police district covers the municipalities of Bodø, Rødøy, Meløy, Gildeskål, Beiarn, Saltdal, Fauske, Sørfold, Steigen, Hamarøy) and two municipalities in Lofoten (Røst and Værøy). As of 2011 the district had 195 employees. It has a special responsibility with the chief of police being responsible for operations at the Joint Rescue Coordination Centre of Northern Norway. The police district was renamed from Bodø Police District in 2002.

References

Police districts in Norway
Organisations based in Bodø